2004 saw many sequels and prequels in video games, such as Doom 3, Dragon Quest VIII, Gran Turismo 4, Grand Theft Auto: San Andreas, Half-Life 2, Halo 2, Metal Gear Solid 3: Snake Eater, Ninja Gaiden, Pokémon FireRed/LeafGreen/Emerald, Everybody's Golf 4 (Hot Shots Golf Fore!), Prince of Persia: Warrior Within, and World of Warcraft. New intellectual properties included Fable, Far Cry, FlatOut, Killzone, Katamari Damacy, Monster Hunter, N, Red Dead Revolver, SingStar, and Sacred. The Nintendo DS was also launched that year.

The year has been retrospectively considered one of the best and most important in video game history due to the release of numerous critically acclaimed, commercially successful and influential titles across all platforms and genres at the time. The year's best-selling video game was Grand Theft Auto: San Andreas. The year's most critically acclaimed titles were Dragon Quest VIII and Gran Turismo 4 in Japan, and Half-Life 2 and San Andreas in the West.

Events
January 20 – Wired'''s Vaporware Awards gives its first "Lifetime Achievement Award" to recurring winner Duke Nukem Forever.
February 26 – Castle Wolfenstein creator Silas Warner dies at age 54.
March 4 – Academy of Interactive Arts & Sciences hosts 7th Annual Interactive Achievement Awards; inducts Peter Molyneux into the AIAS Hall of Fame.
March 22–26 – Game Developers Conference hosts 4th annual Game Developers Choice Awards and Gama Network's 6th annual Independent Games Festival (IGF).
May 11 – Nintendo officially announces its "Revolution" (later named Wii) console.
May 11–13 – The 10th annual E3 is held in Los Angeles, California, United States.
July – IEMA (Interactive Entertainment Merchants Association) hosts 5th annual Executive Summit.
August 3 – Doom 3 is released, restarting the breakthrough franchise, and featured complex graphics features such as unified lighting and shadowing, real-time fully dynamic per-pixel lighting and stencil shadowing. The game became id's best selling game to date.
October 12 – EA Sports launches the multi-format FIFA Football 2005. It is the last major title to be released for the original PlayStation console.
November – Counter-Strike: Source and Half-Life 2 are officially released on PC around the world, bringing in a new era for the first-person shooter genre of video games, with advanced graphics & physics.
November 5 – Nobuo Uematsu resigns from Square Enix and becomes a freelancer, starting his own business, called Smile Please Co., Ltd.
November 17 – Atari Releases the Atari Flashback.
November 21 – Nintendo launches its Nintendo DS handheld in the United States with the enhanced remake Super Mario 64 DS.
December 12 – Sony launches the PlayStation Portable in Japan, and was soon released in other markets in 2005.

Business
January 12 – Ubisoft acquires Tiwak.
February – Electronic Arts consolidates, rolls most of Maxis and all of Origin Systems into its Redwood Shores, California HQ.
March – Microsoft announces XNA the successor of DirectX as the default API for "Longhorn", and Xenon.
April 6 – Midway Games acquires Surreal Software.
May – Sammy Corporation buys a controlling share in Sega Corporation at a cost of $1.1 billion creating the new company, Sega Sammy Holdings, one of the biggest video game companies in the world.
July – Square Enix restructures executive branches around the world.
September 1 – Acclaim declares bankruptcy and closes its doors.
October 11 – Midway Games acquires Inevitable Entertainment and renames it Midway Studios Austin.
November 30 – Midway Games acquires developer Paradox Development.
December 13 – Electronic Arts purchases a 5-year exclusive agreement for the rights to the NFL, which includes NFL teams, stadiums and players for use in EA's football video games.
December 20 – Electronic Arts purchases 20% stake in Ubisoft. The purchase at the time was considered "hostile", by Ubisoft.

Trends
In 2004, the total U.S. sales of video game hardware, software and accessories was $9.9 billion compared with $10 billion in 2003. Total software sales rose 8 percent over the previous year to $6.2 billion. Additionally, sales of portable software titles exceeded $1 billion for the first time. Hardware sales were down 27 percent for the year due in part to shortages during the holiday season and price reductions from all systems.

Video game consoles
Nintendo GameCube
Xbox
PlayStation 2
Sony released an internal hard drive for the PlayStation 2 on March 23
The third major hardware revision of the PlayStation 2 (model number SCPH-70000) was released in Japan on November 1

Handheld game systems
The dominant handheld systems in 2004 were:
Game Boy Advance SP
N-Gage

Additionally, Nokia released an updated version of their original N-Gage, called the N-Gage QD. Nintendo released the Nintendo DS on November 21 in the United States. In Japan Sony released the PlayStation Portable on December 12.

Best-selling video games

 Japan 

 United States 

 PAL regions 

 Top game rentals in the United States 

Critically acclaimed titles

 Famitsu 
In Japan, the following video game releases in 2004 entered Famitsu'' magazine's "Platinum Hall of Fame" and received Famitsu scores of at least 36 out of 40.

Metacritic and GameRankings 
In the West, Metacritic (MC) and GameRankings (GR) are aggregators of video game journalism reviews.

Notable releases

See also
2004 in games

References

 
Video games by year